DVCS may refer to:

Data Validation and Certification Server
Deeply virtual Compton scattering
Distributed version control system
Direct View Camera System